Kirovsky is a rural locality (a settlement) in Ivnyansky District, Belgorod Oblast, Russia. The population was 130 as of 2010. There are 2 streets.

Geography 
Kirovsky is located 8 km north of Ivnya (the district's administrative centre) by road. Fedchevka is the nearest rural locality.

References 

Rural localities in Ivnyansky District